Vega, also known as Balrog (in Japan), is a fictional character from the Street Fighter fighting game series by Capcom. Vega is a mask-wearing, claw-wielding fighter from Spain who uses a personal fighting style combining Japanese ninjutsu and Spanish bullfighting, earning him the nickname of "Spanish Ninja".

Vega first appears in the original Street Fighter II in 1991 as the second of four boss opponents the player faces at the end of the single-player mode, a group known as the Four Devas, Grand Masters, or the Four Heavenly Kings. From Street Fighter II: Champion Edition (the second version of the game) onwards, Vega and the other three boss characters became playable. He reappears as a playable character in Street Fighter Alpha 3, Street Fighter EX2 and EX3, the Capcom vs. SNK series, SNK vs. Capcom: SVC Chaos, Street Fighter IV, Super Street Fighter IV, Street Fighter X Tekken, Ultra Street Fighter IV and Street Fighter V.

Conception and creation
Vega was designed by Akira Yasuda with the premise of the original Street Fighter's Geki character in mind, and was initially conceived as a brief sketch of a masked man in a ripped shirt with long, frizzy hair. As development progressed the design evolved into a large, unarmed man, retaining the mask and dressed as a matador. The design was changed again, revolving around the concept of a foreign soldier with a cross on his vest and armed with a broadsword, while still retaining the mask. This design was eventually replaced in turn with another concept, a masked ninja in a bodysuit armed with a long metal claw on his right hand. Ultimately the character's finalized appearance was a culmination of all of these, incorporating various aspects of each into the finished design.

When the original Street Fighter II was being localized for the English language market, Capcom's North American marketing staff felt that the name of the game's final boss, Vega, did not sound threatening enough to North American audiences, and was hence better suited for the bullfighter, as Vega is by itself a Spanish surname. Plus, afraid of a lawsuit from American boxer Mike Tyson (whose name and appearance was very similar to the game's first boss), they felt inclined to change the name of this character as well. For international tournaments he is named Claw. As a result, Balrog's name was changed from バルログ to Vega for English-language appearances, while original Vega (the dictator) became M.Bison and original M.Bison (the boxer) became Balrog.

Design
Vega is one of the few Street Fighter characters to constantly carry a weapon, a tekkō kagi, and the only character to do so in Street Fighter II. This claw is useful for slashing attacks, yet curved in the end to prevent him from lethally stabbing his opponents. This claw gives him a very long range compared to most characters. It is the same type of weapon worn by Geki in the original Street Fighter, though longer.

Obsessively narcissistic and vain, Vega considers himself the epitome of beauty and perfection. As such, he wears his expressionless mask not to conceal his identity, but to protect his face from scarring or bruising during battle; in fact, Vega removes it after winning fights, as well as in certain character-select images.

Vega wears murrey and yellow ceremonial trousers, a red sash, loafers, and white leggings of a matador, suggesting his involvement with bullfighting. This decorative garb also offers matadors ease of movement, and is ideal for Vega's acrobatic maneuvers.

Depending on the games' color palettes, Vega has brown or blonde hair. In the various games in the Street Fighter II series, Vega's game sprite and character select profile shot depict him with brown hair, while his ending in Street Fighter II': Champion Edition and Super Street Fighter II depict him with blonde hair. In Street Fighter EX2 and Street Fighter Alpha 3, Vega is depicted with blonde hair in all iterations. His tattoos consist of a purple snake on his chest and two purple bands which circle his arm. In Capcom vs. SNK 2, in a victory pose, Vega will hold his arm out towards the opponent, with the tattoo coming to life and hissing at it. In the mobile puzzle game Street Fighter: Puzzle Spirits, he appears as a super-deformed character.

Appearances

In video games
Vega's backstory reveals that he was born to a noble family in Spain. As he matured, Vega studied bullfighting, a Spanish cultural tradition. He later traveled to Japan to learn ninjutsu, a style that he believed would mesh well with his natural grace and agility. Returning home, Vega combined bullfighting with ninjutsu and entered an underground cage fighting circuit, where he quickly became one of the best.

For undisclosed reasons, his family's status dwindled, causing his mother to remarry for financial security. Vega's new stepfather, incensed that his wife only valued him for his money, murdered her right in front of Vega, who killed him in return. The incident warped his mind and caused him to develop a dual personality: suave nobleman by day, sadistic masked murderer by night. Brandishing a three-pronged, razor sharp claw gauntlet, Vega embarked on many murderous rampages, taking great pleasure in mutilating his victims, especially those he perceived as "ugly". The murder of his mother caused him to view "beauty" as a trait of heroism and strength, whereas "ugliness" represented cowardice and evil. Eventually, Vega's insatiable bloodlust and brutal fighting skills caught the attention of criminal leader M. Bison, who accepted the young nobleman into Shadaloo as his personal assassin and one of his three Grand Master bodyguards. Vega accepted Bison's offer purely to improve his own aesthetic senses. His official tag partner in the crossover fighting game Street Fighter X Tekken is Balrog, although they are shown to loathe each other due to their clashing personalities.

Gameplay
Vega is one of the fastest characters in the Street Fighter series, and also one of the most fragile. His strength is in long-range attacks, with the reach advantage provided by his claw, his speed and jumps. During fights, Vega is capable of losing his claw. This reduces his attack range significantly, and prevents him from performing certain moves. Since Super Street Fighter II Turbo, Vega can pick up the claw again if lost. Other games allow Vega to lose his mask, lowering his health but increasing his attack power as a result. In Street Fighter EX2, Street Fighter EX3, and Street Fighter IV Vega can take his claw and mask off manually. Vega becomes able to switch freely between clawed and bare-handed in his most recent rendition, Street Fighter V.

In other media
In the 1994 live-action film version of Street Fighter, Vega was played by American actor Jay Tavare in his film debut. He is depicted as a member of the Shadaloo Tong working for Sagat. Along with his trademark mask and claw, he has very few lines during the whole film and utters them while his face is obscured or when he is off-camera. He forms a rivalry with Ryu, and in the film's final battle, he is defeated by Ryu and abandoned by Sagat to presumably die when Bison's base explodes. He also appears in the arcade game based on the film titled Street Fighter: The Movie, as well as in the home video game also based on the film. In the arcade version of the game, Vega has the ability to take his mask off and throw it to his opponent. In the home version, this ability was removed and Vega fights unmasked.

In the 2009 live-action film Street Fighter: The Legend of Chun-Li, Vega is played by rapper Taboo of the group The Black Eyed Peas as an assassin for Bison's Shadaloo corporation. This version of Vega retains his claw and mask, but the mask is made of metal and he appears dressed in black from head to toe. The film changed the reason Vega wears the mask, from protecting his face to concealing his identity.

In the 1994 anime film Street Fighter II: The Animated Movie, Vega was voiced by Kaneto Shiozawa in Japanese and Richard Cansino in the English dub. In the film, he works for Shadowlaw under Bison, and is sent to New York to kill Chun-Li. He almost succeeds through a vicious and bloody duel that takes its toll on both fighters, but after baiting Vega into a rage by attacking his face, Chun-Li eventually defeats him by Hundred-Burst-Kicking him through her apartment wall into the streets far below where he presumably dies.

In the 1995 anime Street Fighter II V, Vega appears as a young amorous bullfighter who tries to seduce Chun-Li. Envious over Ryu and Ken's friendship with Chun-Li, Vega invites the three to a party in his castle, which is actually a trap to lure Ryu and Ken to a caged death match with him. Since Ryu does not attend the party, he subsequently fights only Ken, and is finally defeated after a brutal match. He is given the surname of Fabio La Cerda in the series. Kaneto Shiozawa provided his voice for the Japanese version, while Vic Mignogna provided his voice for the English dub from ADV Films and Richard Cansino provided his voice for the Animaze English dub. In the Spanish dub, his full name is listed as Fabio Antonio de la Vega.

Vega appears in two episodes of the 1995 American Street Fighter animated series, "Eye of the Beholder" and "Face of Fury", where he is a former henchman of Bison promised eternal youth who develops a rivalry against Blanka. He was voiced by Paul Dobson in the series.

Vega makes a non-speaking cameo appearance in 1999 anime miniseries Street Fighter Alpha: The Animation, where he ends up pulverizing, though not outright killing, his opponent Dan Hibiki during an underground fight. Vega reappears in the Shadaloo helicopter near the end of Street Fighter IV: The Ties That Bind.

Reception

In 1992, he was ranked 16th on Japanese magazine Gamest's list of the best video game characters introduced in 1991. Vega was voted fifth in Capcom's own poll of 85 characters for the 15th anniversary of Street Fighter, making him the most popular male character. IGN ranked Vega at number ten in their "Top 25 Street Fighter Characters" article, stating "he deserves all the credit in the world for originality. There's never been a Street Fighter character quite like him since." GameDaily ranked him at number twelve on their "Top 20 Street Fighter Characters of All Time" article, noting the strength of his aerial attacks, and also put Vega on their "Tattooed Video Game Characters" list. Vega is placed at 28th in a worldwide Street Fighter character poll held between 2017 and 2018.

He ranked 46th in GamePros "47 Most Diabolical Video-Game Villains of All Time" article. News.com.au named Vega one of the sexiest characters in video games, placing him tenth in their "Top 10" article and stating "part ninja, part bullfighter, Vega's fighting style is definitely one of the most unusual we've seen." NowGamer listed a fight between Vega and Yoshimitsu under their "Street Fighter X Tekken Character Wishlist" and commented "Any bout between these two would be a mind-boggling display of fast attacks across the screen.". GamesRadar noted that while his attire and obsession with beauty was a departure from traditional depictions of ninjas, the features made him "one of the more iconic scrappers in the Street Fighter games". They additionally listed him as one of the most outrageous camp villains, stating that a "camp bad guy list" without Vega was like a "cheese sandwich without the cheese or bread," while describing him as "more narcissistic than two clones of Narcissus having sex in a room full of mirrors." In 2013, GamesRadar included him in a list of "The 30 Best Capcom Characters of the Last 30 Years."

See also
 Fantômas
 Laurence Blood

References

External links
 Vega's Street Fighter II, Street Fighter Alpha, Street Fighter EX, and Street Fighter IV entries at StrategyWiki.org

Action film characters
Capcom antagonists
Fictional assassins in video games
Fictional criminals in video games
Fictional henchmen in video games
Fictional fist-load fighters
Fictional murderers
Fictional Ninjutsu practitioners
Fictional savateurs
Fictional serial killers
Fictional Spanish people in video games
Male characters in video games
Male film villains
Male video game villains
Ninja characters in video games
Narcissism in fiction
Street Fighter characters
Video game bosses
Video game characters introduced in 1991
Nobility characters in video games